Eija-Liisa Ahtila (born 1959 in Hämeenlinna, Finland) is a contemporary visual artist and filmmaker who lives and works in Helsinki.

Ahtila is most known for her multi-panel cinematic installations. She experiments with narrative storytelling in her films and cinematic installations. In her earlier works, she dealt with the topic of unsettling human dramas at the center of personal relationships, dealing with teenage sexuality, family relationships, mental disintegration, and death. Her later works, however, pursue more profound artistic questions where she investigates the processes of perception and attribution of meaning, at times in the light of larger cultural and existential themes, like colonialism, faith and posthumanism.

Ahtila has participated in numerous international art exhibitions such as Manifesta (1998), the Venice Biennale (1999 and 2005), documenta 11 (2002), São Paulo Art Biennial (2008) and the Sydney Biennale in 2002 and 2018.

Ahtila has won several art and film awards, including the inaugural Vincent Award (2000), Artes Mundi (2006), Prince Eugen Medal (2008), and most recently Art Academic in Finland (2009).

Her work is held in the collections of the Tate and the Museum of Modern Art in New York. She is a former professor at the Department of Time and Space-based Art at the Finnish Academy of Fine Arts (Finland).

Artistic career
Writing in the journal PAJ, Jane Philbrick describes Ahtila's films as "Smart, emotionally arresting, engaging, affective." Philbrick continues, saying, "A self-described 'teller of human dramas', she approaches narrative equipped with a rigorous arsenal of postmodern strategies ... One of her most potent tools, however, is a two-centuries-old dramatic genre of proven emotional reach and punch, melodrama." Although done in a more sophisticated way than conventional melodramas, Ahtila's work likewise exaggerates plots and characters to affect the viewer's emotions, with less appeal to immediate intellectual comprehension.

In 1993, Ahtila created the three mini-films Me/We, Okay, and Gray: Each of these 90-second mini-films was shown separately and as a trilogy, as trailers in cinemas, on television during commercial breaks and in art galleries. Ahtila explores questions of identity and group relations through her use of narrative conventions derived from film, television and advertising.
In Me/We the father of a family speaks about his family in a monologue and other players mouth his words. When the father speaks about his family members' emotions, their personalities mix together and become inseparable.
In Okay a woman is speaking about violence in man and woman relationship and as she steps across the room like a tiger in a cage, her voice goes up and shows pure violence.
In Gray three women in a lift go down into the water and talk about the atomic explosion and its effects, while words and pictures mix identity crisis and an atomic disaster.

In 2002, Ahtila created a film called The House, for which she performed research that included conducting interviews with people who are afflicted by psychotic mental disorders. The film begins with a woman driving to a secluded house, and as events continue they take on a dreamlike state. The sounds become disorienting and the images begin to combine: the woman can see the car on the walls of the house; she hears boat horns that make no sense. The film is meant to be presented in an exhibit that displays each of the three screens on separate walls, making the viewer feel as if they are actually in the house where the project was filmed.

In 2002 she had a solo show at Tate Modern, and in 2006 her multi-screen video piece The Wind (2006) was exhibited at the Museum of Modern Art (MoMA). She has also had solo shows at the Guggenheim in Bilbao, Moderna Museet in Stockholm, the Neue Nationalgalerie in Berlin, the Parasol Unit in London, ACMI in Melbourne and DHC/ART in Montreal.

Among Ahtila's many other works is The Hour of Prayer, first presented in 2005 at the Venice Biennale in Italy. The film is a four-channel video project that shows scenes from a woman's experience surrounding the death of her dog. Bridget Goodbody, writing for Time Out New York, says that it presents "a nonnarrative cycle of apparently random, but nonetheless consequential scenes." Some of those scenes show how, when she was away from her dog, he fell through the ice of a frozen pond, breaking his leg. Another shows the dog brought to a veterinarian for treatment of the injury; a diagnosis of bone cancer is made. After the dog dies, the film presents scenes of the woman moving on with her life, living as an artist in Africa.

Another of her films, which debuted in 2009, is Where is Where?. New York's Museum of Modern Art, which housed the seven-day exhibition, called it, "a haunting and layered consideration of how history affects our perception of reality." In the film, a present-day poet, with the assistance of a figure who is the personification of death, investigates a murder committed fifty years ago. Two young Arab boys had killed their French friend during the Algerian War of Independence. As the poet investigates, images from the past and present begin to mix and collide; at one point the poet discovers the two boys seated in a boat, in the small swimming pool behind his house.

In 2011 Ahtila's exhibition horizontal first showed at the Marian Goodman Gallery. This piece is a 6 projection instillation showing a pine tree. Each projection shows a different part of the tree. Ahtila distorts the pine tree with tilts of the camera and different coloring for each projection. 

Although Ahtila's films do include more than one character, they tend to focus on the internal experience of just one person. Her work seems to be more about studying and understanding an individual's subjective experience, and how the influences around individuals shape who they are and what they do, and shape their unconscious selves. She is greatly interested in the factors that go into the construction of personal identity, and in how fluid that construct can be. Ahtila wants to explore, as she says, "how the subconscious is inherited in some way," citing as an example, "[the way] in which my mother is physically present in myself and I am present in her."

Works

Installations 
 Me/We, Okay, Grey (1993), 3-channel monitor installation with furniture
 If 6 was 9 (1995), 3-channel projected installation
 Today (1996), 3-channel projected installation
 Anne, Aki and God (1998), 5-monitor & 2-screen installation with furniture
 Consolation Service (1999), 2-channel projected installation
 The Present (2001), 5-channel monitor installation with furniture
 The House (2002), 3-channel projected installation
 The Wind (2002), 3-channel projected installation
 Sculpture in the Age of Posthumanism (2004), a sculpture which includes the viewer
The Hour of Prayer (2005), 4-channel projected installation
 Fishermen / Études N°1 (2007), single channel projected installation
 Where is Where? (2008), 6-channel projected installation
 The Annunciation (2010), 3-channel projected installation
 Horizontal (2011), 6-channel projected installation
 Studies on the Ecology of Drama (2014), 4-channel projected installation
 Potentiality for Love (2018), a hybrid installation that combines sculpture with moving image

Films 
 Me/We, Okay, and Gray (1993), three 90-second mini-films, each of which was shown separately and as a trilogy, as trailers in cinemas and on television during commercial breaks. Ahtila explores questions of identity and group relations through her use of narrative conventions derived from film, television and advertising.
 If 6 was 9 (1995)
 Today (1996), won Honorable Mention in 1998.
 Consolation Service (1999), Received Venice biannual prize.
 Love is a Treasure (2002)
 The Hour of Prayer (2005)
 Where is Where? (2008)
 The Annunciation (2010)
 Studies on the Ecology of Drama (2017)

Awards 
 2013, Main Prize, Art Lab category, Festival Internazionale del Cinema d’Arte, Milan, Italy (work: The Annunciation)
 2012, Arte Award for Best European Film, International Short Film Festival Oberhausen, Germany (work: The Annunciation)
 2009, Title of Academician of Art, presented by the President of Finland, Helsinki, Finland
 2008, The Prince Eugen Medal for outstanding artistic achievement, Stockholm, Sweden
 2006, Artes Mundi, Wales International Visual Arts Prize, Cardiff, UK
 2005, Pro Finlandia Medal, Order of the Lion of Finland, Helsinki, Finland
 2002, Great Prize Fiction, Vila do Conde International Short Film Festival, Portugal (Work: Love is a Treasure)
 2002, Best Fiction Prize, Kettupäivät Film Festival, Helsinki, Finland (Work: Love is a Treasure)
 2002, Quality Production Award, National Council for Audiovisual Arts, Helsinki, Finland
 2000, The Vincent van Gogh Bi-annual Award for Contemporary Art in Europe, Maastricht, The Netherlands
 2000, Coutts Contemporary Art Foundation Award, Zurich, Switzerland
 2000, Best Nordic Short Film, Nordisk Panorama, Bergen, Norway (Work: Consolation Service)
 2000, Main Prize, National Competition, Tampere International Short Film Festival, Finland (Work: Consolation Service)
 2000, Quality Production Award, National Council for Audiovisual Arts, Helsinki, Finland
 1999, Honorary Mention, 48th Venice Biennale, Italy (Work: Consolation Service)
 1999, Quality Production Award, National Council for Audiovisual Arts, Helsinki, Finland
 1998, Edstrand Art Prize, Malmö, Sweden
 1998, International Competition Film Award, VIPER International Festival for Film and New Media, Basel, Switzerland (Work: Today)
 1998, Bonn Videonale, WDR Prize for female artist, Bonn, Germany (Work: Today)
 1997, Jury's Honorary Mention, International Short Film Festival Oberhausen, Germany (Work: Today)
 1997, National Competition, Main Prize, Tampere International Short Film Festival, Finland (Work: Today)
 1997, AVEK -award for important achievements in the field of audio-visual culture, Helsinki, Finland
 1997, International Competition Film Award, VIPER International Festival for Film and New Media, Basel, Switzerland (Work: If 6 was 9)
 1993, Quality Production Award, National Council for Audiovisual Arts, Helsinki, Finland
 1990, Young Artist of the Year Award, Tampere, Finland

References

External links
 Eija-Liisa Ahtila official website
 
 Artist profile at Marian Goodman Gallery
 
 BOMB Magazine interview with Eija-Liisa Ahtila, by Cary Wolfe
 Eija-Liisa Ahtila’s Affective Images in The House, by Tarja Laine, Dept. of Media and Culture, Univ. of Amsterdam. Published in Spring, 2006, edition of Mediascape, UCLA's journal of cinema and media studies.
 Artist's page on Artfacts.Net
 The Guardian review of Tate Modern show
 ArtForum review of Tate Modern show
 New York Times review of The Wind at MoMA

1959 births
Living people
20th-century Finnish women artists
20th-century photographers
20th-century women photographers
21st-century Finnish women artists
21st-century photographers
21st-century women photographers
Finnish filmmakers
Feminist artists
Finnish feminists
Finnish women photographers
People from Hämeenlinna
Recipients of the Prince Eugen Medal
Finnish photographers
Finnish video artists